

Teams
A total of eighteen teams contested the league, including sixteen sides from the 1974–75 season and two sides promoted from the 1974–75 Yugoslav Second League (YSL) as winners of the two second level divisions East and West. The league was contested in a double round robin format, with each club playing every other club twice, for a total of 34 rounds. Two points were awarded for wins and one point for draws.

FK Bor and Proleter Zrenjanin were relegated from the 1974–75 Yugoslav First League after finishing the season in bottom two places of the league table. The two clubs promoted to top level were Borac Banja Luka and Budućnost.

Managers

League table

Results

Winning squad

Top scorers

Attendance

Overall league attendance per match: 11,670 spectators

See also
1975–76 Yugoslav Cup
Yugoslav League Championship
Football Association of Yugoslavia

External links
Yugoslavia Domestic Football Full Tables

Yugoslav First League seasons
Yugo
1975–76 in Yugoslav football